Anna Maria Hilton ( Hermann, born 17 February 1963) is a Swedish equestrian. She competed in the individual eventing at the 1992 Summer Olympics.

References

External links
 
 
 

1963 births
Living people
Swedish female equestrians
Olympic equestrians of Sweden
Equestrians at the 1992 Summer Olympics
People from Lidingö Municipality
Sportspeople from Stockholm County